Phúc Thắng may refer to several places in Vietnam, including:

Phúc Thắng, Vĩnh Phúc, a ward of Phúc Yên
Phúc Thắng, Bắc Giang, a commune of Sơn Động District